Sexy Lady may refer to:

"Sexy Lady" (Jessie J song)
"Sexy Lady" (Yung Berg song)

See also
"Sexy Ladies"
Sexy Girl (disambiguation)